The FK Baku 2008-09 season was Baku's 11th Azerbaijan Premier League season, and was their second season with Gjoko Hadžievski as their manager, having replaced Boyukagha Hajiyev in July 2007. They finished the season in 1st place in the league and were knocked out of the 
Azerbaijan Cup at the Semi-final stage by Qarabağ.

Squad

Transfers

Summer

In:

Out:

Winter

In:

Out:

Competitions

Azerbaijan Premier League

Results summary

Results

Table

Azerbaijan Cup

Squad statistics

Appearances and goals

|-
|colspan="14"|Players who appeared for Baku who left on loan during the season:

|-
|colspan="14"|Players who appeared for Baku who left during the season:

|}

Goal scorers

Notes
On 31 October 2008, FK NBC Salyan changed their name to FK Mughan.
Qarabağ have played their home games at the Tofiq Bahramov Stadium since 1993 due to the ongoing situation in Quzanlı.

References

FC Baku seasons
Baku